Raymond Eitel Maskill (fourth ¼ 1905 – death unknown) was an English professional rugby league footballer who played in the 1920s, 1930s and 1940s.

Background
Raymond Maskill's birth was registered in Pontefract district, West Riding of Yorkshire, England.

Playing career

Club career
Raymond Maskill made his début for Castleford on Saturday 17 November 1928, he played his last match for Castleford on Saturday 3 October 1931, he transferred from Castleford to Wakefield Trinity, he made his début for Wakefield Trinity during February 1932, he played his last match for Wakefield Trinity during September 1934, he transferred from Wakefield Trinity to the Hull Kingston Rovers, he made his début for the Hull Kingston Rovers on Saturday 29 August 1936, and he played his last match for the Hull Kingston Rovers on Saturday 12 January 1946.

Note
"The Robins: An Official History of Hull Kingston Rovers" has Raymond Maskill playing 115-matches, scoring 8-tries for 24-points, whereas "Hull Kingston Rovers - A Centenary History 1883-1983" has him playing 114-matches, scoring 7-tries for 21-points.

References

External links
Search for "Maskill" at rugbyleagueproject.org
Raymond Maskill Memory Box Search at archive.castigersheritage.com
Ray Maskill Memory Box Search at archive.castigersheritage.com
Maskill Memory Box Search at archive.castigersheritage.com
Search for "Raymond Maskill" at britishnewspaperarchive.co.uk
Search for "Ray Maskill" at britishnewspaperarchive.co.uk

1905 births
Castleford Tigers players
English rugby league players
Hull Kingston Rovers players
Place of death missing
Rugby league players from Pontefract
Rugby league props
Rugby league second-rows
Wakefield Trinity players
Year of death missing